Devidhan Besra ( – 25 August 2022) was an Indian politician, belonging to Bharatiya Janata Party. In the 2009 election he was elected to the Lok Sabha from the Rajmahal Lok Sabha constituency of Jharkhand.

Besra died from prostate cancer on 25 August 2022, at the age of 77.

Posts Held

See also
 Rajmahal (Lok Sabha constituency)

References

External links
 Official biographical sketch in Parliament of India website

1940s births
Year of birth missing
2022 deaths
India MPs 2009–2014
Bharatiya Janata Party politicians from Jharkhand
Lok Sabha members from Jharkhand
People from Pakur district